In probability theory, the central limit theorem (CLT) establishes that, in many situations, for identically distributed independent samples, the standardized sample mean tends towards the standard normal distribution even if the original variables themselves are not normally distributed. 

The theorem is a key concept in probability theory because it implies that probabilistic and statistical methods that work for normal distributions can be applicable to many problems involving other types of distributions. 

This theorem has seen many changes during the formal development of probability theory. Previous versions of the theorem date back to 1811, but in its modern general form, this fundamental result in probability theory was precisely stated as late as 1920, thereby serving as a bridge between classical and modern probability theory.

For example, suppose that a sample is obtained containing many observations, each observation being randomly generated in a way that does not depend on the values of the other observations, and that the arithmetic mean of the observed values is computed. If this procedure is performed many times, the central limit theorem says that the probability distribution of the average will closely approximate a normal distribution. 

The central limit theorem has several variants. In its common form, the random variables must be independent and identically distributed (i.i.d.). In variants, convergence of the mean to the normal distribution also occurs for non-identical distributions or for non-independent observations, if they comply with certain conditions.

The earliest version of this theorem, that the normal distribution may be used as an approximation to the binomial distribution, is the de Moivre–Laplace theorem.

Independent sequences

Classical CLT

of the first  samples. 

By the law of large numbers, the sample averages converge almost surely (and therefore also converge in probability) to the expected value  as  

The classical central limit theorem describes the size and the distributional form of the stochastic fluctuations around the deterministic number  during this convergence. More precisely, it states that as  gets larger, the distribution of the difference between the sample average  and its limit  when multiplied by the factor   approximates the normal distribution with mean 0 and variance  For large enough , the distribution of  gets arbitrarily close to the normal distribution with mean  and variance  

The usefulness of the theorem is that the distribution of  approaches normality regardless of the shape of the distribution of the individual  Formally, the theorem can be stated as follows:

In the case  convergence in distribution means that the cumulative distribution functions of  converge pointwise to the cdf of the  distribution: for every real 

where  denotes the least upper bound (or supremum) of the set.

Lyapunov CLT
The theorem is named after Russian mathematician Aleksandr Lyapunov. In this variant of the central limit theorem the random variables  have to be independent, but not necessarily identically distributed. The theorem also requires that random variables  have moments of some order  and that the rate of growth of these moments is limited by the Lyapunov condition given below.

In practice it is usually easiest to check Lyapunov's condition for 

If a sequence of random variables satisfies Lyapunov's condition, then it also satisfies Lindeberg's condition. The converse implication, however, does not hold.

Lindeberg CLT

In the same setting and with the same notation as above, the Lyapunov condition can be replaced with the following weaker one (from Lindeberg in 1920).

Suppose that for every 

where  is the indicator function. Then the distribution of the standardized sums

converges towards the standard normal distribution

Multidimensional CLT
Summation of these vectors is being done component-wise. The multidimensional central limit theorem states that when scaled, sums converge to a multivariate normal distribution.

Let

be the -vector. The bold in  means that it is a random vector, not a random (univariate) variable. Then the sum of the random vectors will be

and the average is

and therefore

The multivariate central limit theorem states that

where the covariance matrix  is equal to

The rate of convergence is given by the following Berry–Esseen type result:

It is unknown whether the factor  is necessary.

Generalized theorem

The central limit theorem states that the sum of a number of independent and identically distributed random variables with finite variances will tend to a normal distribution as the number of variables grows. A generalization due to Gnedenko and Kolmogorov states that the sum of a number of random variables with a power-law tail (Paretian tail) distributions decreasing as  where  (and therefore having infinite variance) will tend to a stable distribution  as the number of summands grows. If  then the sum converges to a stable distribution with stability parameter equal to 2, i.e. a Gaussian distribution.

Dependent processes

CLT under weak dependence
A useful generalization of a sequence of independent, identically distributed random variables is a mixing random process in discrete time; "mixing" means, roughly, that random variables temporally far apart from one another are nearly independent. Several kinds of mixing are used in ergodic theory and probability theory. See especially strong mixing (also called α-mixing) defined by  where  is so-called strong mixing coefficient.

A simplified formulation of the central limit theorem under strong mixing is:

In fact,

where the series converges absolutely.

The assumption  cannot be omitted, since the asymptotic normality fails for  where  are another stationary sequence.

Existence of such  ensures the conclusion. For encyclopedic treatment of limit theorems under mixing conditions see .

Martingale difference CLT

Remarks

Proof of classical CLT
The central limit theorem has a proof using characteristic functions. It is similar to the proof of the (weak) law of large numbers.

Assume  are independent and identically distributed random variables, each with mean  and finite variance  The sum  has mean  and variance  Consider the random variable

where  is "little  notation" for some function of  that goes to zero more rapidly than  By the limit of the exponential function  the characteristic function of  equals

All of the higher order terms vanish in the limit  The right hand side equals the characteristic function of a standard normal distribution , which implies through Lévy's continuity theorem that the distribution of  will approach  as  Therefore, the sample average

is such that 

converges to the normal distribution  from which the central limit theorem follows.

Convergence to the limit
The central limit theorem gives only an asymptotic distribution. As an approximation for a finite number of observations, it provides a reasonable approximation only when close to the peak of the normal distribution; it requires a very large number of observations to stretch into the tails.

The convergence in the central limit theorem is uniform because the limiting cumulative distribution function is continuous. Stein's method can be used not only to prove the central limit theorem, but also to provide bounds on the rates of convergence for selected metrics.

The convergence to the normal distribution is monotonic, in the sense that the entropy of  increases monotonically to that of the normal distribution.

The central limit theorem applies in particular to sums of independent and identically distributed discrete random variables.  A sum of discrete random variables is still a discrete random variable, so that we are confronted with a sequence of discrete random variables whose cumulative probability distribution function converges towards a cumulative probability distribution function corresponding to a continuous variable (namely that of the normal distribution).  This means that if we build a histogram of the realizations of the sum of  independent identical discrete variables, the curve that joins the centers of the upper faces of the rectangles forming the histogram converges toward a Gaussian curve as  approaches infinity, this relation is known as de Moivre–Laplace theorem. The binomial distribution article details such an application of the central limit theorem in the simple case of a discrete variable taking only two possible values.

Relation to the law of large numbers
In mathematical analysis, asymptotic series are one of the most popular tools employed to approach such questions.

Suppose we have an asymptotic expansion of :

Informally, one can say: " grows approximately as ".

The idea is that dividing the function by appropriate normalizing functions, and looking at the limiting behavior of the result, can tell us much about the limiting behavior of the original function itself.

Informally, something along these lines happens when the sum, of independent identically distributed random variables, is studied in classical probability theory.  If each  has finite mean , then by the law of large numbers, .  If in addition each  has finite variance , then by the central limit theorem,

This provides values of the first two constants in the informal expansion

In the case where the  do not have finite mean or variance, convergence of the shifted and rescaled sum can also occur with different centering and scaling factors:

or informally

Distributions  which can arise in this way are called stable. Clearly, the normal distribution is stable, but there are also other stable distributions, such as the Cauchy distribution, for which the mean or variance are not defined.

The law of the iterated logarithm specifies what is happening "in between" the law of large numbers and the central limit theorem.

Alternative statements of the theorem

Density functions
The density of the sum of two or more independent variables is the convolution of their densities (if these densities exist).  Thus the central limit theorem can be interpreted as a statement about the properties of density functions under convolution: the convolution of a number of density functions tends to the normal density as the number of density functions increases without bound. These theorems require stronger hypotheses than the forms of the central limit theorem given above. Theorems of this type are often called local limit theorems. See Petrov for a particular local limit theorem for sums of independent and identically distributed random variables.

Characteristic functions
Since the characteristic function of a convolution is the product of the characteristic functions of the densities involved, the central limit theorem has yet another restatement: the product of the characteristic functions of a number of density functions becomes close to the characteristic function of the normal density as the number of density functions increases without bound, under the conditions stated above. Specifically, an appropriate scaling factor needs to be applied to the argument of the characteristic function.

An equivalent statement can be made about Fourier transforms, since the characteristic function is essentially a Fourier transform.

Calculating the variance
Let  be the sum of  random variables.

Extensions

Products of positive random variables
The logarithm of a product is simply the sum of the logarithms of the factors.  Therefore, when the logarithm of a product of random variables that take only positive values approaches a normal distribution, the product itself approaches a log-normal distribution.  Many physical quantities (especially mass or length, which are a matter of scale and cannot be negative) are the products of different random factors, so they follow a log-normal distribution.  This multiplicative version of the central limit theorem is sometimes called Gibrat's law.

Whereas the central limit theorem for sums of random variables requires the condition of finite variance, the corresponding theorem for products requires the corresponding condition that the density function be square-integrable.

Beyond the classical framework
Asymptotic normality, that is, convergence to the normal distribution after appropriate shift and rescaling, is a phenomenon much more general than the classical framework treated above, namely, sums of independent random variables (or vectors). New frameworks are revealed from time to time; no single unifying framework is available for now.

Convex body

These two -close distributions have densities (in fact, log-concave densities), thus, the total variance distance between them is the integral of the absolute value of the difference between the densities. Convergence in total variation is stronger than weak convergence.

An important example of a log-concave density is a function constant inside a given convex body and vanishing outside; it corresponds to the uniform distribution on the convex body, which explains the term "central limit theorem for convex bodies".

If  then  factorizes into  which means  are independent. In general, however, they are dependent.

The condition  ensures that  are of zero mean and uncorrelated; still, they need not be independent, nor even pairwise independent. By the way, pairwise independence cannot replace independence in the classical central limit theorem.

Here is a Berry–Esseen type result.

The distribution of  need not be approximately normal (in fact, it can be uniform).

Lacunary trigonometric series

Gaussian polytopes

The same also holds in all dimensions greater than 2.

The polytope  is called a Gaussian random polytope.

A similar result holds for the number of vertices (of the Gaussian polytope), the number of edges, and in fact, faces of all dimensions.

Linear functions of orthogonal matrices
A linear function of a matrix  is a linear combination of its elements (with given coefficients),  where  is the matrix of the coefficients; see Trace (linear algebra)#Inner product.

A random orthogonal matrix is said to be distributed uniformly, if its distribution is the normalized Haar measure on the orthogonal group ; see Rotation matrix#Uniform random rotation matrices.

Subsequences

Random walk on a crystal lattice

The central limit theorem may be established for the simple random walk on a crystal lattice (an infinite-fold abelian covering graph over a finite graph), and is used for design of crystal structures.

Applications and examples

A simple example of the central limit theorem is rolling many identical, unbiased dice. The distribution of the sum (or average) of the rolled numbers will be well approximated by a normal distribution. Since real-world quantities are often the balanced sum of many unobserved random events, the central limit theorem also provides a partial explanation for the prevalence of the normal probability distribution. It also justifies the approximation of large-sample statistics to the normal distribution in controlled experiments.

Regression
Regression analysis and in particular ordinary least squares specifies that a dependent variable depends according to some function upon one or more independent variables, with an additive error term. Various types of statistical inference on the regression assume that the error term is normally distributed. This assumption can be justified by assuming that the error term is actually the sum of many independent error terms; even if the individual error terms are not normally distributed, by the central limit theorem their sum can be well approximated by a normal distribution.

Other illustrations

Given its importance to statistics, a number of papers and computer packages are available that demonstrate the convergence involved in the central limit theorem.

History
Dutch mathematician Henk Tijms writes:

Sir Francis Galton described the Central Limit Theorem in this way:

The actual term "central limit theorem" (in German: "zentraler Grenzwertsatz") was first used by George Pólya in 1920 in the title of a paper. Pólya referred to the theorem as "central" due to its importance in probability theory. According to Le Cam, the French school of probability interprets the word central in the sense that "it describes the behaviour of the centre of the distribution as opposed to its tails". The abstract of the paper On the central limit theorem of calculus of probability and the problem of moments by Pólya in 1920 translates as follows.

A thorough account of the theorem's history, detailing Laplace's foundational work, as well as Cauchy's, Bessel's and Poisson's contributions, is provided by Hald. Two historical accounts, one covering the development from Laplace to Cauchy, the second the contributions by von Mises, Pólya, Lindeberg, Lévy, and Cramér during the 1920s, are given by Hans Fischer. Le Cam describes a period  around 1935. Bernstein presents a historical discussion focusing on the work of Pafnuty Chebyshev and his students Andrey Markov and Aleksandr Lyapunov that led to the first proofs of the CLT in a general setting.

A curious footnote to the history of the Central Limit Theorem is that a proof of a result similar to the 1922 Lindeberg CLT was the subject of Alan Turing's 1934 Fellowship Dissertation for King's College at the University of Cambridge.  Only after submitting the work did Turing learn it had already been proved. Consequently, Turing's dissertation was not published.

See also
 Asymptotic equipartition property
 Asymptotic distribution
 Bates distribution
 Benford's law – Result of extension of CLT to product of random variables.
 Berry–Esseen theorem
 Central limit theorem for directional statistics – Central limit theorem applied to the case of directional statistics
 Delta method – to compute the limit distribution of a function of a random variable.
 Erdős–Kac theorem – connects the number of prime factors of an integer with the normal probability distribution
 Fisher–Tippett–Gnedenko theorem – limit theorem for extremum values (such as )
 Irwin–Hall distribution
 Markov chain central limit theorem
 Normal distribution
 Tweedie convergence theorem – A theorem that can be considered to bridge between the central limit theorem and the Poisson convergence theorem

Notes

References

.

External links

 Central Limit Theorem at Khan Academy

 
 A music video demonstrating the central limit theorem with a Galton board by Carl McTague

 
Probability theorems
Theorems in statistics
Articles containing proofs
Asymptotic theory (statistics)